The Broderip scholarship of the Middlesex Hospital is named for Francis Broderip, a large benefactor to the hospital in 1871.

Recipients of the scholarship include:

William Freer Lucas
Kenneth Lawson
Moran Campbell
Thomas Lionel Hardy
Sir Edward Muir
Eric Lush Pearce Gould
Arnold Lawson
Donald Acheson
Sir Kenneth Robson
Richard Turner-Warwick
Roger William Gilliatt
Shikandhini Kanagasundrem

References 

Broderip scholars